Gary Stephen "Angry" Anderson  (born 5 August 1947) is an Australian rock singer, songwriter, television personality and actor. He has been the lead vocalist and the last remaining original member of the hard rock band Rose Tattoo since 1976. As a solo artist, he is best known for his international hit "Suddenly" (1987).

On Australia Day 26 January 1993, Anderson was made a Member of the Order of Australia for his role as a youth advocate. According to rock music historian, Ian McFarlane, "over the course of a lengthy career, [the] gravel-throated vocalist ... has gone from attention-grabbing, rock'n'roll bad boy to all-round Australian media star." Rose Tattoo were inducted into the Australian Recording Industry Association (ARIA) Hall of Fame in 2006.

Biography 

Gary Stephen Anderson was born on 5 August 1947 in Melbourne, Victoria, to an Australian father and Mauritian mother. He has a brother Rodney living in Melbourne. Anderson's nickname of "Angry Ant" developed "during his youth after his aggressive and volatile nature got the better of him." According to Anderson, his father "was a deeply troubled man... I've dealt with my rage, my pain... I was a very angry boy... When he was around he was a very explosive person." Anderson used his uncle, Ivan, as his role model, he "was a cigarette-smoking, beer-drinking, leather jacket-wearing, motorcycle-riding drummer in a swing band." Anderson grew up in suburban Coburg and attended Coburg Technical School before working as a fitter and turner in a factory. Initially he wanted to be a blues guitarist, "I wanted to be like all the great blues guitar players, then I wanted to be like Bob Dylan, then of course... John Lennon." Anderson found himself in a band with three possible guitarists and "[t]he other two were much better than me, so the only other thing we needed was a singer... [we] had to sing 'Twist and Shout' without accompaniment. I just happened to be the best one at it."

From 1971 to 1973, Anderson led rock group Peace Power and Purity and came to wider public notice as the lead vocalist with Buster Brown. He fronted the hard rock and blues rock band from its foundation in 1973, the original line-up included Phil Rudd on drums, who left in 1974 to join AC/DC. In 1975, Buster Brown released an album, Something to Say, on Mushroom Records/Festival Records before disbanding in November that year.

In 1976 in Sydney, Rose Tattoo was formed by Peter Wells of the heavy metal band Buffalo. Anderson had relocated to Sydney and replaced the group's original singer Tony Lake. When their drummer Michael Vandersluys departed soon afterwards, he was replaced by Dallas Royall, who had been Rudd's replacement in Buster Brown. Their most popular single on the Australian Kent Music Report Singles Chart was "Bad Boy for Love" from 1977, which peaked at No. 19. Rose Tattoo's 1981 tour of Europe included an appearance at the Reading Festival, where Anderson repeatedly head butted the amp stacks until his scalp started bleeding.

Anderson's debut as an actor was a minor role in Bullamakanka (1983). Later, he appeared as the character Ironbar Bassey in the film Mad Max Beyond Thunderdome (1985). Filmink magazine later wrote that Anderson "appeared in surprisingly few acting roles for someone with such renown as a presenter."

Anderson joined as a guest vocalist with The Incredible Penguins, for a cover of "Happy Xmas (War Is Over)", a charity project for research on little penguins, which peaked at No. 10 in December 1985. In 1987, he played Lenin in the musical Rasputin, composed by David Tyyd, at the State Theatre in Sydney.

Anderson led Rose Tattoo through five studio albums until disbanding the group in 1987, by which time he was the only member remaining from the early line-up. During 1986, as Rose Tattoo was winding down following the recording of Beats from a Single Drum, Anderson joined The Party Boys for an Australian tour, but never recorded with them. By this time Anderson had established himself as an advocate on social issues and made regular appearances on the Channel Nine programs The Midday Show with Ray Martin and then A Current Affair as a human interest reporter.

In 1987, Anderson had his biggest hit, when the uncharacteristic ballad "Suddenly" from the album, Beats from a Single Drum, was used as the wedding theme for the Neighbours episode in which the popular characters Scott Robinson and Charlene Mitchell married. Robinson was portrayed by Jason Donovan, while Mitchell's character was portrayed by pop singer, Kylie Minogue, who had issued her debut single in July as a cover version of "Locomotion." "Locomotion" was at number one on the Australian charts preventing "Suddenly" from reaching the top spot. Beats from a Single Drum had been planned as Anderson's debut solo release, but had initially been billed as a Rose Tattoo album due to contractual obligations; however, after the success of "Suddenly", it was re-released in 1988 as an Angry Anderson solo album. In November 1988, the single reached number three on the UK Singles Chart after the episode aired there.

With the dissolution of Rose Tattoo, Anderson pressed on with his solo career, releasing the album Blood from Stone in 1990 which provided the No. 11 hit single "Bound for Glory." According to The Punch's Michael Phelan, Anderson's performance was "a teeth-gnashing, eyeballs-bleeding, nails-scratching-down-a-blackboard rendition" and rates it as the worst pre-game display in Australian sporting history. In 1992, Anderson acted in the Australian arena-style revival of Jesus Christ Superstar as Herod. On Australia Day (26 January) 1993, Anderson was made a Member of the Order of Australia with the citation, "In recognition of service to the community, particularly as a youth advocate." Also that year, Rose Tattoo reunited to support Guns N' Roses on the Australian leg of their Use Your Illusion Tour, Guns N' Roses specifically requested The Tatts to support Them in Australia. However the reunion was short-lived and the band's members returned to their solo projects.

From 1994, Anderson has used his contacts in the media to organise a Challenge where a particular charity's project was completed with support of community and business groups. Examples of these Challenges include constructing a playground for disabled children within 48 hours, assisting drought affected farmers with reserve feed for their stock, organising Christmas presents for socially and economically disadvantaged children, building two respite units for people living with and affected by HIV AIDS and delivering artificial limbs for Cambodian land mine victims.

Rose Tattoo reconvened in 1998 and undertook an Australian tour. The group has continued to perform despite five Rose Tattoo former band members dying of cancer: Dallas Royall (1991), Peter Wells (2006), Ian Rilen (2006), Lobby Loyde (2007), and Mick Cocks (2009). According to rock music historian, Ian McFarlane, "over the course of a lengthy career, [the] gravel-throated vocalist ... has gone from attention-grabbing, rock'n'roll bad boy to all-round Australian media star." On 16 August 2006, Rose Tattoo were inducted into the Australian Recording Industry Association (ARIA) Hall of Fame.

In the early years of the 2000s, Anderson participated in and organised a string of charity events. In 2002, Anderson played with former members of The Angels at the Bali Relief concert in Perth, Western Australia, held in aid of victims of the Bali bombing. Anderson is involved in the Dunn Lewis Youth Development Foundation, which is a lasting legacy of two of the 88 Australian lives lost in the bombings. In 2003, Anderson appeared in a cameo role as the character Kris Quaid in the independent Australian feature film Finding Joy. At the end of the film, he sings his hit "Suddenly."

Anderson appeared in a guest role in the Australian movie Suite for Fleur (2011), as Silas, Fleur's father, a carpenter and furniture maker living in Byron Bay. In December, Anderson joined Doc Neeson – The Angels, Mark Gable – The Choirboys, Buzz Bidstrup – The Angels, Phil Emmanuel and Matt Sorum (drummer for Guns N' Roses) on-stage to celebrate the opening of a Hard Rock Cafe in Darling Harbour. In January 2012, Anderson announced that Rose Tattoo would disband – he is a member of the National Party and is considering using his birth name, Gary, for "political expediency" when running as a candidate in the next federal election.

In 2014, Anderson was featured on 7mate's successful television series Bogan Hunters as one of eight celebrity judges. Later that year, Anderson scored a role in the motion picture Fat Pizza vs. Housos. The film was shown in Australian cinemas from 27 November 2014 onwards.

Political views 
In July 2007, Anderson was criticised by some after espousing his views on Muslim immigration to Australia when he told the Sydney Daily Telegraph:

On 1 March 2010, he told a Federal Parliamentary Committee into the impact of violence on youth that life experience has taught him "Aussies use their fists" when they fight and that "weapons were introduced by other cultures." In March 2011, Anderson declared he was a supporter of conservative politician Tony Abbott and his views against a tax on carbon dioxide emissions. He announced in October that year that he was joining the conservative National Party, and was interested in standing for a seat in the next Australian federal election. When asked whether his more 'leftie views' might be gagged (he supports same-sex marriage, for example)  he replied, "maintaining some sort of order and balance is about agreement, compromise, setting rules as the head of the house. I've learnt to be a part of the family. So I'm not going to say things in public that are going to embarrass the party."  He was selected as the National candidate for the Division of Throsby in New South Wales under his birth name, Gary Anderson.  Although he didn't win, his preferences helped the Coalition net a four-percent swing in the seat.

In 2012, Anderson participated in the SBS doco-reality show Go Back To Where You Came From, in which six Australians, each with differing opinions on Australia's asylum seeker debate, were taken on a journey to which refugees have taken to reach Australia. At the outset of the series Anderson says that "boat people" who arrive in Australia illegally should be sent back to their countries of origin: "If you come here illegally, I don't care about your story, first thing you do is you turn around and go back."  Later in the series, after having met with refugees from Afghanistan who settled in Melbourne as well as visiting war-torn Kabul, Anderson softened his stand on the subject: "Now I've been here and spoken to people, I don't want to turn away refugees, I don't want to turn away people who need to be reunited with their families. I don't want that. Who would want that?  I don't want people to go on suffering needlessly, when we can give them somewhere safe to be. But I don't want them to come to Australia in boats."

Again endorsed by the National Party in September 2014, this time in the New South Wales seat of Cessnock for the 2015 state election, Anderson withdrew his candidacy in February 2015, citing personal reasons.

In 2016 Anderson was endorsed as an Australian Liberty Alliance candidate for the Senate representing New South Wales at the 2016 federal election. The Australian Liberty Alliance is a right wing group that opposes Muslim immigration to Australia.

Personal life 
In Angry Anderson's 1994 biography, Angry – Scarred for Life, the author Karen Dewey describes his life as "Sexually, physically and mentally abused he broke the brutal family pattern to become a besotted, devoted father of four." Anderson described how "[t]here was physical and emotional violence in the family" and a family friend began sexually abusing him from the age of five.

In 1982, prior to one of Rose Tattoo's European tours, Anderson met Lindy Michael. The couple's daughter, Roxanne was born in 1983. Anderson and Michael married in January 1986 and have also had three sons, Galen, Blaine and Liam. By 2002, Anderson and Michael were divorced. Anderson is a single father and lives in the Sydney suburb of Beacon Hill. Although he does not believe in an omniscient god he attends the Baha'i temple regularly, "the spirituality I have given myself over to is the divine."

Having seen cancer claim the lives of five of his Rose Tattoo bandmates (Dallas Royall, Peter Wells, Ian Rilen, Lobby Lloyde and Mick Cocks), Anderson has become an advocate for men's health. He appeared in a TV campaign promoting awareness of prostate cancer.

On 4 November 2018, Anderson's son Liam was killed in an attack in a park in Queenscliff, New South Wales.

Discography

Rose Tattoo

Buster Brown

Solo albums

Singles

See also 
 "You're Not Alone" (Australian Olympians song)

Filmography 
 At Last... Bullamakanka: The Motion Picture (1983) – Senator's Aide
 Mad Max Beyond Thunderdome (1985) – Ironbar
 Scuff the Sock (1987, TV Movie) – Plasterer
 Finding Joy (2002) – Kris Quaid
 Fat Pizza (2003) – Bikie
 Pizza (2005, TV Series) – Bikie Leader / Tattooist / Captain / Vietnam Vet
 Swift and Shift Couriers (2008–2011, TV Series) – Aaron 'Agro' Smith
 Suite For Fleur (2011)
 Housos vs. Authority (2012) – Angry
 Go Back To Where You Came From (2012, TV Series documentary) – Himself – Participant
 Housos (2011–2013; 2020, TV Series) – Angry
 Fat Pizza vs. Housos (2014) – Angry
 Bogan Hunters (2014, TV Series) – Himself – Celebrity Judge
 Dumb Criminals: The Movie (2015) – Angry
 Fat Pizza: Back in Business (2019–2021, TV Series) – Angry

Awards

Mo Awards 
The Australian Entertainment Mo Awards (commonly known informally as the Mo Awards), were annual Australian entertainment industry awards. They recognise achievements in live entertainment in Australia from 1975 to 2016. Angry Anderson won one award in that time.
 (wins only)
|-
| 1995
| Angry Anderson
| John Campbell Fellowship Award
| 
|-

Further reading 
 
 Murray Engleheart. Blood, Sweat & Beers- Oz Rock from the Aztecs to Rose Tattoo . Published by HarperCollins Australia. 2010.
Edward DuykerOf the Star and the Key: Mauritius, Mauritians and Australia, Australian Mauritian Research Group, Sylvania, 1988, p. 107.

References 

General
 
 Note: Archived [on-line] copy has limited functionality.
Specific

External links 

 
 
 "Rose Tattoo's Angry Anderson" interview with Richard Fidler of Australian Broadcasting Corporation as an MP3 file.

1947 births
Australian people of Mauritian descent
Australian male television actors
Australian male film actors
20th-century Australian male actors
21st-century Australian male actors
20th-century Australian male singers
21st-century Australian male singers
The Party Boys members
Singers from Melbourne
Members of the Order of Australia
Australian heavy metal singers
Living people
Rose Tattoo members
People from Coburg, Victoria